The men's K-4 1000 metres event was a fours kayaking event conducted as part of the Canoeing at the 1968 Summer Olympics program. In the official report, heat results were shown in tenths of a second (0.1) while the remaining events were shown in hundredths of a second (0.01).

Medalists

Results

Heats
The 19 crews first raced in three heats on October 22. The top three finishers from each of the heats advanced directly to the semifinals while the remaining ten teams were relegated to the repechage heats.

Hansen of Denmark's first name is listed as Jorgen in the official report. In 2008, Spain's Perurena became President of the International Canoe Federation and would become a member of the International Olympic Committee three years later.

Repechages
Taking place on October 23, three of the top five competitors in each of the two repechages advanced to the semifinals.

Semifinals
The top three finishers in each of the three semifinals (raced on October 24) advanced to the final.

Final
The final was held on October 25.

Norway's surprise victory was credited to their trainer Stein Johnson, who had coached previously in athletics, skiing, and speed skating before going into flatwater canoeing. Johnson also finished eighth in the men's discus throw event at the 1948 Summer Olympics in London.

References
1968 Summer Olympics official report Volume 3, Part 2. pp. 620–1. 
Sports-reference.com 1968 K-4 1000 m results.
Wallechinsky, David and Jaime Loucky (2008). "Canoeing: Men's Kayak Fours 1000 Meters". In The Complete Book of the Olympics: 2008 Edition. London: Aurum Press Limited. pp. 476–7.

Men's K-4 1000
Men's events at the 1968 Summer Olympics